The 2018 NCAA Division I FCS football season, part of college football in the United States, was organized by the National Collegiate Athletic Association (NCAA) at the Division I Football Championship Subdivision (FCS) level.  The FCS Championship Game was played on January 5, 2019, in Frisco, Texas. North Dakota State claimed its second consecutive FCS title, and seventh in eight years.

Conference changes and new programs

Membership changes

In addition to the schools changing conferences, the 2018 season was the last for Savannah State in D-I with its decision to reclassify all of its sports to D-II.

Source:

Other headlines

Offseason
 June 13 – Major changes to redshirt rules in Division I football (both FBS and FCS) took effect from this season forward after having been approved by the NCAA Division I Council. Players can now participate in as many as four games in a given season while still retaining redshirt status. The only exception to this new rule is that players who enroll at a school in midyear and participate in postseason competition that takes place during or before their first academic term at that school will lose a full year of athletic eligibility.

Season
 September 10 – The Northeast Conference (NEC) announced that Merrimack College would start a transition from the NCAA Division II Northeast-10 Conference (NE-10) and join the NEC effective July 1, 2019. Merrimack's football team is expected to immediately start playing a full NEC schedule, but will not be eligible for the FCS playoffs until becoming a full D-I member in 2023.
 October 3 – Long Island University announced that it would merge its two current athletic programs—the LIU Brooklyn Blackbirds, full but non-football members of the NEC, and LIU Post Pioneers, a Division II program that is a full member of the non-football East Coast Conference and an NE-10 football member—effective with the 2019–20 school year. The new program will compete under the LIU name with a new nickname. The Post football team will become the LIU football team, playing in the NEC. There has been no definitive report as to when the new LIU football team will be eligible for the FCS playoffs.
 October 27 – Central Connecticut's Aaron Dawson ran for 308 yards in the second half, a record for a half throughout Division I, and 361 overall to lead the Blue Devils to a 49–24 win over Wagner.
 November 17 – In the final game of his college career, Samford quarterback Devlin Hodges set a new FCS record for career passing yardage, surpassing late Alcorn State and NFL great Steve McNair in the Bulldogs' 38–27 win over East Tennessee State. Hodges finished his career with 14,584 yards.
 January 4 – The NCAA and the Southland Conference (SLC) announced that the FCS championship game, which is currently co-hosted by the SLC, would remain at its current home of Toyota Stadium in the Dallas suburb of Frisco, Texas through at least the 2024 season, with an option for the 2025 season.

Pre-season international exhibitions

Kickoff games
One kickoff game was played during "Week Zero" on August 25:
FCS Kickoff (Cramton Bowl, Montgomery): North Carolina A&T defeated Jacksonville State, 20–17

FCS team wins over FBS teams
(FCS rankings from the STATS poll, FBS rankings from the AP poll.)
August 30:
 UC Davis 44, San Jose State 38
September 1:
 No. 18 Nicholls 26, Kansas 23 OT
 Northern Arizona 30, UTEP 10
 No. 19 Villanova 19, Temple 17
September 2:
 No. 14 North Carolina A&T 28, East Carolina 23
September 8:
 No. 22 Maine 31, Western Kentucky 28
September 22:
 No. 16 Illinois State 35, Colorado State 19

Hurricane Florence

All times Eastern

Several games on the east coast were rescheduled, canceled, or moved due to Hurricane Florence:
Coastal Carolina at Campbell moved up to Wednesday, September 12 at 2:00 p.m.
Richmond at Saint Francis moved up to Thursday, September 13 at 5:00 p.m.
Robert Morris at No. 2 James Madison moved up to Thursday, September 13 at 7:00 p.m.
Guilford at Davidson has been moved up to Thursday, September 13 at 7:00 p.m.
East Tennessee State at VMI moved up to Friday, September 14 at 2:30 p.m.
Western Carolina at Gardner–Webb moved up to Friday, September 14 at 6:00 p.m.
North Carolina Central at South Carolina State has been moved to Saturday, November 24
Charleston Southern at The Citadel has been moved to Thursday, November 29
Norfolk State at Liberty has been moved to Saturday, December 1
Elon at William & Mary has been canceled
Savannah State at Howard has been canceled
Tennessee State at Hampton has been canceled
Presbyterian at Stetson has been canceled
Walsh at Jacksonville has been canceled
Colgate at Furman has been canceled
Sources:

Conference standings

Conference summaries

Championship games

Other conference winners
Note: Records are regular-season only, and do not include playoff games.

Playoff qualifiers

Automatic berths for conference champions

At large qualifiers

Abstentions
Ivy League – Princeton
Mid-Eastern Athletic Conference – North Carolina A&T
Southwestern Athletic Conference – Alcorn State

Postseason

NCAA Division I playoff bracket

Bowl games

Awards and honors

Walter Payton Award
The Walter Payton Award is given to the year's most outstanding offensive player. Finalists:
 Chandler Burks (QB), Kennesaw State
 Devlin Hodges (QB), Samford
 Easton Stick (QB), North Dakota State

Buck Buchanan Award
The Buck Buchanan Award is given to the year's most outstanding defensive player. Finalists:
 Zach Hall (LB), Southeast Missouri State
 Dante Olson (LB), Montana
 Derick Roberson (DE), Sam Houston State

Jerry Rice Award
The Jerry Rice Award is given to the year's most outstanding freshman.
 Winner: Josh Davis (RB), Weber State

Coaches
AFCA Coach of the Year: Joe Harasymiak, Maine
Eddie Robinson Award: Dan Hawkins, UC Davis

Coaching changes

Preseason and in-season
This is restricted to coaching changes that took place on or after May 1, 2018. For coaching changes that occurred earlier in 2018, see 2017 NCAA Division I FCS end-of-season coaching changes.

End of season

See also
 2018 NCAA Division I FCS football rankings
 2018 NCAA Division I FBS football season
 2018 NCAA Division II football season

References